William-Pierre Grant (June 3, 1872 – August 25, 1943) was a politician Quebec, Canada and a Member of the Legislative Assembly of Quebec (MLA).

Early life

He was born on June 3, 1872 in Chicoutimi, Saguenay–Lac-Saint-Jean.  He made career in the lumber industry.

Member of the legislature
Grant won a by-election as a Liberal candidate in the district of in the provincial district of Champlain in 1925.  He was re-elected in 1927 and 1931.

He did not run for re-election in 1935.  He was succeeded by Ulphée-Wilbrod Rousseau of the Action libérale nationale.

Death
He died on August 25, 1943 in Batiscan, Mauricie.

See also
Champlain Provincial Electoral District
Mauricie

References

1872 births
1943 deaths
Quebec Liberal Party MNAs